Sri Venkateswara Junior College is established in 1992 in CAM High school road, Mulapet Nellore city, Nellore District, Andhra Pradesh India.Pin code 524003 under the leadership of Dr peddisetty Suneel kumar PhD for last 27 years.

External links
Sri Venkateswara Junior College

Colleges in Andhra Pradesh
Universities and colleges in West Godavari district
1992 establishments in Andhra Pradesh
Educational institutions established in 1992
Junior colleges in India